Return of the Jedi is a science-fiction novel, written by James Kahn and published on May 12, 1983 by Del Rey. It is based on the script of the film of the same name. According to Publishers Weekly, it was the bestselling novel of that year.

Characters

Differences from the film
When Leia is captured by Jabba, instead of him saying, "I'm sure," to her warning of her powerful friends, he says, "I'm sure, but in the meantime, I shall thoroughly enjoy the pleasure of your company." Additionally, instead of simply licking his lips as seen in the movie, he is described as planting "a beastly kiss squarely on the Princess's lips".
On the cover art, the laser light of Luke's lightsaber is blue, but in the film it is green.
Obi-Wan Kenobi's account of Luke's parental history is expanded; Obi-Wan states that Owen Lars was his own brother, and that Luke and Leia's mother died when they were four (a premise later overwritten by the prequel trilogy, in which Owen Lars is seen to be Anakin Skywalker's stepbrother, and Luke and Leia's mother, Padmé Amidala, dies in childbirth). Obi-Wan also recounts his battle with Anakin, stating that Anakin "fell into a molten pit", part of the backstory later adapted as Star Wars: Episode III – Revenge of the Sith (2005). Additionally, Obi-Wan tells Luke that Anakin did not know that their mother was pregnant, while in Revenge of the Sith he is well aware of the pregnancy.
C-3PO's story alone does not convince the Ewoks to help the Rebels. Han attempts to persuade them by telling them the Empire is draining Endor's resources, but also fails. It is ultimately the Ewok Wicket who convinces the tribal elders to help the Rebels. C-3PO is also described as having a "wobbly, amazed smile" after being levitated by Luke to impress the Ewoks, which is inconsistent with the series' depiction of the droid's immotile face.
There is an expanded version of the initial conversation between the Emperor and Luke Skywalker.  It includes Palpatine questioning Luke about who instructed him after Kenobi's death; upon discovering that it was Yoda, Emperor proceeds to mock the late Jedi Master by mimicking his object–subject–verb style of speech.
 Ewoks Paploo and Teebo are shown doing most of the things assigned to other Ewoks in the film – they argue over what to do with the captured Rebels before Logray steps up with an opposing point of view. Teebo commands the Ewok army and initiates each phase of the attack. Also, Wicket and Teebo are the ones to assist Chewbacca hijacking the AT-ST, not Widdle and Wunka as seen in the film. At the same time, Teebo and Paploo are not members of the party that actually captures the Rebels, while they are in the film.
The battle in space above Endor is given an expanded treatment. The text describes a much larger Rebel fleet than what is seen on film.
Moff Jerjerrod, acting on orders given to him by Emperor Palpatine, orders the Death Star to turn and fire on the Sanctuary Moon of Endor, but is killed when the Death Star's reactor is destroyed before the station can complete its final task. His character is also expanded from the film: the novelization depicts him as a sadist who derives an inflated sense of his own power from dominating his subordinates and fighting the Rebels as brutally as possible. This differs from scenes shot for – but not included – in the final film, in which Jerjerrod ultimately has a crisis of conscience in the final act, though he is still ordered by the Emperor to fire the Death Star on the Endor moon just prior to its destruction.

See also
Star Wars: From the Adventures of Luke Skywalker
The Empire Strikes Back (novel)

References

1983 American novels
1983 science fiction novels
Return of the Jedi
American science fiction novels
Del Rey books
Novels based on films
Novel
Space opera novels